Stillborn Records is an American-based independent record label, founded by Jamey Jasta of Hatebreed, and primarily operated by Jay Reason of the Distance. Stillborn Records has released a variety of bands, mainly focused in the genres of heavy metal and hardcore punk. Stillborn Records is based in West Haven, Connecticut, United States.

Distribution
Stillborn Records releases are currently distributed through many well known worldwide distributors, including but not limited to Caroline Distribution, RevHQ.com, Interpunk.com, iTunes, and via their own website StillbornRecords.com.

Stillborn Fest
Stillborn Records is the organizer of the annual Stillborn Fest, that takes place over multiple dates in multiple cities around the US. The festival features current Stillborn Records artists as well as other artists not on the label's roster. Stillborn Fest has featured such bands as Hatebreed, H2O, A Life Once Lost, Crowbar, and Thy Will Be Done.

Featured bands
 Abolish
 Another Victim
 Better Left Unsaid
 Blacklisted
 Bloodwar
 Candiria
 Catalepsy
 Channel
 Clear
 Cold as Life
 Damnation
 Suffokate
 Dead to the World
 Dead Wrong
 Deadbeat
 Death Threat
 Dying Breed
 Full Blown Chaos
 Hatebreed
 Hoods
 Icepick
 Integrity
 Jasta 14
 Legacy of Pain
 Love Is Red
 Neglect
 One 4 One
 Overthrow
 The Program
 Pushbutton Warfare
 Right Brigade
 Ringworm
 The Risk Taken
 Scurvy
 Stalemate
 Strength for a Reason
 Subzero
 The Takeover
 A Thousand Falling Skies
 Thy Will Be Done
 The Ugly Truth
 Voice of Reason
 What Feeds the Fire
 With Honor
 The World We Knew
 The Wrong Side

See also
 List of record labels

References

External links
 Official website
 Official Myspace
 Martyr Store.com

American record labels
Hardcore record labels
West Haven, Connecticut